Quintin Maurice Jones (born July 28, 1966) is a former American football safety in the National Football League for the Houston Oilers. He also was member of the Montreal Machine in the World League of American Football. He played college football at the University of Pittsburgh.

Early years
Jones attended Ely High School, where he was a cornerback. He accepted a football scholarship from the University of Pittsburgh. As a freshman, he was named the starter at left cornerback and tied for second on the club with 2 interceptions.

As a sophomore, he was a part of a Panther's defensive secondary that was called "The Burnt Toast Patrol", after giving up a school record 2,283 passing yards.

As a junior, he tied with Billy Owens for the team lead with 4 interceptions. He finished his college career with 8 interceptions.

Professional career
Jones was selected by the Houston Oilers in the second round (48th overal) of the 1988 NFL Draft, to play safety. After a lengthy contract holdout, he was signed on October 4.

He was waived on September 4, 1989. In April 1990, he was signed as a free agent by the Oilers to play cornerback. He was released on September 12.

On February 24, 1991, he was drafted by the Montreal Machine of the World League of American Football. He was named the starting strong safety. In 1992, he began the season with the team, before being released on April 30.

On April 15, 1993, he was signed by the Sacramento Gold Miners of the Canadian Football League. He was released before the start of the season.

References

External links
Quintin Jones Stats

1966 births
Living people
Jones, Quintin
Players of American football from Miami
American football cornerbacks
Pittsburgh Panthers football players
Houston Oilers players
Montreal Machine players